The action off James Island was a naval engagement of the War of 1812. In May 1813 an American frigate captured three British whalers off James Island in the South Pacific. Only one of the whalers resisted and the resultant single-ship action was one of the few fought in Pacific waters during the war. The British later recovered all the whalers involved.

Background
Following Captain David Porter's passage of Cape Horn in  a year earlier, the United States Navy vessel focused on commerce raiding by attacking British whalers off the coast of South America. Georgiana initially carried two guns but Porter increased her armament to six 18-pounders, four swivel guns, and six blunderbusses. He placed Lieutenant John Downes in command and gave him a crew of forty-two navy men and six volunteers, recently captured American sailors. Porter then instructed Downes to harass the British off James Island in the Galapagos chain.

Action
Leaving Essex on May 12, Downes headed in a southern direction for James. While nearing the island in the afternoon on May 28, lookouts aboard Georgiana sighted a mast and sails on the horizon. In fact the sails belonged to two brigs, the 270-ton whaler , accompanied by the 220-ton whaler . Downes ordered his men to give chase and raised the Union Jack to trick the whalers into believing that they were not under threat. When the Americans were within range they lowered a few boats filled with men and captured the two sloops without resistance. Later the British captains revealed to Downes that they did not realize they were being attacked until after the Americans were on deck.

On board the two vessels were a total of sixteen guns, eight each, and fifty sailors, whom the Americans took prisoner. Georgiana maneuvered to pursue and after several moments of chasing, the sun had gone down before the Americans were in firing range. In the dark, Georgiana fired a warning shot at Hector, which responded with inaccurate broadsides. The Americans then engaged and began raking the British vessel, ripping off its main mast and most of the rigging. Four more broadsides followed and when it seemed as though the whaler's fire had weakened, Georgiana moved in to board. Just as the Americans drew near, the British lowered their colors and surrendered so the boarding took place without hostilities.

Two British sailors had been killed and six others seriously wounded. Apparently all of the British shots passed over Georgiana or fell short. Thus the Americans reported no damage or casualties.

Aftermath
Seventy-five prisoners were taken but because there were fewer than fifty Americans to guard them, Lieutenant Downes disarmed Rose and transferred the prisoners to her. They were then released on parole and ordered to Saint Helena. Georgiana returned to Essex, which was anchored of Tumbez, Peru, on 24 June. Captain Porter was now in command of nine armed vessels in the Pacific. Lieutenant Downes was promoted on November 28, 1813, for gallantry in his many actions against the British and the natives of Nuka Hiva.

The British later recaptured all three whalers and returned them to whaling.  recaptured Georgiana in the Atlantic on 28 November 1813, and sent her into Bermuda.

Note
Only Rose was sailing under a letter of marque, which Captain Mark Munro had received on 15 August 1811. It described Rose as of 245 tons (bm), with a crew of 24 men, and armed with eight 12 and 9-pounder guns. By virtue of the letter, she was authorized to engage in offensive action. The other two British whalers, Catherine and Hector, were legally only allowed to use their armament in self-defense.

Citations and references
Citations

References
Clayton, Jane M. (2014) Ships employed in the South Sea Whale Fishery from Britain: 1775-1815: An alphabetical list of ships. (Berforts Group). 

Naval battles of the War of 1812
Pacific Ocean
Galápagos Islands
May 1813 events